Venneshamn is a village in the municipality of Inderøy in Trøndelag county, Norway. It is located along the Trondheimsfjord on the northeastern end of the Fosen peninsula. Verran Sparebank (Norway's smallest bank) was based in Venneshamn until 2006 when it merged with Grong Sparebank. There was also a general store here until it closed in August 2008.

The port of Venneshamn had a scheduled ferry service for many years. In 1958, the car ferry company Innherredsferja started the Levanger–Hokstad–Vangshylla–Kjerringvika–Venneshamn Ferry, connecting the village to roads at Mosvik, Inderøy, Ytterøy, and Levanger.  In 1968, a county road was completed from Kjerringvika to Venneshamn, granting the settlement road access to the main village of Mosvik.

References

Villages in Trøndelag
Inderøy